is a platform video game developed by Sonic Team USA and published by Sega. It was the final Sonic the Hedgehog game for the Dreamcast after Sega left the home console market. It features two good-vs-evil stories: Sonic the Hedgehog, Tails, and Knuckles the Echidna attempt to save the world, while Shadow the Hedgehog, Doctor Eggman, and Rouge the Bat attempt to conquer it. The stories are divided into three gameplay styles: fast-paced platforming for Sonic and Shadow, multi-directional shooting for Tails and Eggman, and action-exploration for Knuckles and Rouge.

Development began soon after the American release of Sonic Adventure in 1999 and lasted 18 months. Sonic Adventure 2 was produced in commemoration of the Sonic series' tenth anniversary and was designed to be faster-paced and more action-oriented than the original. The development team also expanded upon the presence of the Chao creatures and other player characters. Its locations were influenced by American locations such as San Francisco and Yosemite National Park. Sega announced Sonic Adventure 2 in October 1999 and exhibited it at E3 2000. It was released on June 19, 2001 in the United States, then worldwide on June 23, 2001.

Sonic Adventure 2 received generally positive reviews for its gameplay variety, visuals, and audio, though some criticized its camera, voice acting, and plot. It quickly became a cult game, and an enhanced port for the GameCube, Sonic Adventure 2: Battle, was released in late 2001 in Japan and early 2002 in North America and Europe; it features improved textures and multiplayer options. Together, the Dreamcast and GameCube versions sold more than  copies worldwide. Sonic Adventure 2 was also released as a downloadable game for the PlayStation 3, Xbox 360, and Windows in 2012.

Gameplay 

Sonic Adventure 2 is a 3D platform game divided into two campaigns: Hero and Dark. In the Hero campaign, players control Sonic, Tails, and Knuckles, who fight to save the world; in the Dark campaign, players control Shadow the Hedgehog, Doctor Eggman and Rouge the Bat, fighting to conquer it. Each campaign cycles through levels of its three characters, telling different sides of the story. Levels have a variety of themes (such as cities, jungles, desert pyramids and outer space), with some followed by boss fights. The two campaigns' stories occur in parallel; completing both campaigns unlocks a final story with all six characters, culminating in a final boss fight.

Sonic and Shadow play fast-paced levels, emphasizing platforming. Their homing attack can lock on to robots created by Eggman and G.U.N., and they can grind on rails. Tails's and Eggman's levels are slower and oriented towards multidirectional shooting; they are confined to mechs in which they can jump short heights, hover and shoot enemies. Knuckles's and Rouge's levels are open and feature action-adventure gameplay with treasure hunting; in each level, they must find three shards of the Master Emerald. Their search is guided by radar and puzzle-based clues from harmless robots. Knuckles and Rouge can glide, defeat enemies with punches and kicks, and scale walls, digging into them to find power-ups.

Adventure 2 has the health system found in many other Sonic games. The player collects rings scattered throughout the levels; being hit by an enemy while holding rings causes the player to drop them all, while being hit without rings causes them to lose a life. Tails and Eggman have health bars, which are slowly refilled by collecting rings. Dying with no lives results in a game over screen. The characters can obtain permanent upgrades that grant them new abilities; for example, one upgrade allows Sonic and Shadow to dash along a sequential trail of rings to reach distant platforms, one gives Tails and Eggman hover jets that slows their descent in order to cross large gaps, while another lets Knuckles and Rouge dig into the ground to uncover treasure and Master Emerald pieces.

Separate from the main campaigns, the player can raise Chao as virtual pets. They have five attributes (Swim, Fly, Run, Power and Stamina) and a moral continuum from Hero to Dark. From the moment they hatch, their stats can be increased with Chaos Drives or small animals, found in the main stages, which empower them to compete in karate and racing minigames. Their alignment gradually changes based on their affection for the characters; for example, a Chao which likes Tails will gradually become more heroic. Playing with Chao increases affection, and when a Chao becomes fully Hero or Dark, it assumes that form permanently. Although Chao eventually die, if they receive enough affection during their lives they reincarnate.

Adventure 2 has 180 emblems, earned for a variety of tasks. Each level has five missions; only the first is required to continue the campaign, and other missions include completing a harder version of a level and collecting 100 rings. The player earns emblems by completing missions and other tasks, many related to Chao raising. Collecting all the emblems unlocks a 3D version of the Green Hill Zone stage from the original Sonic the Hedgehog.

The game has several two-player modes. Players may race on foot through new (or altered) levels, have shoot-'em-up battles in mechs, hunt for Master Emerald shards or race in go-karts. A few characters are playable in these modes, but not in the main game; Tikal and Chaos from the original Sonic Adventure are playable in the treasure-hunting game, as are Amy Rose and Metal Sonic in the foot-racing levels and mechs piloted by Chao and Big the Cat (replaced by a Dark Chao in Battle) in the shooting levels.

Plot 
Learning of a secret weapon from the diary of his deceased grandfather, Professor Gerald Robotnik, Doctor Eggman infiltrates a high-security G.U.N. (Guardian Units of Nations) facility and revives it using a Chaos Emerald. The weapon – a black hedgehog and self-proclaimed "Ultimate Life Form" named Shadow – offers to help Eggman conquer the world, telling him to rendezvous at an abandoned space colony, ARK, with more Chaos Emeralds. Shadow goes to Central City, encountering G.U.N.'s forces after stealing an Emerald. Shadow has vowed to fulfill a promise to Gerald's granddaughter, Maria, right before she died, which he interprets as one of revenge. Shadow blasts through the military force and meets Sonic. After a brief confrontation, Shadow escapes and G.U.N. captures Sonic, whom they mistake for Shadow.

Meanwhile, Knuckles encounters Rouge and Eggman, who both try to steal the Master Emerald. He stops them by shattering the Emerald and searches for the scattered shards to repair it. Rouge, spying for the government, heads to Eggman's base and the ARK. There, Shadow shows Eggman the Eclipse Cannon, another super-weapon created by Gerald, and discloses his plan: to charge the cannon with the Chaos Emeralds and use it to take over the world. Rouge appears, offering them a Chaos Emerald to gain their trust.

Tails and Amy infiltrate G.U.N.'s island base and rescue Sonic, while Eggman, Shadow, and Rouge collect three Emeralds on the island. Eggman makes a global broadcast threatening to fire on the Earth in 24 hours if his demands are not met, demonstrating the cannon's power by using it to destroy half the Moon using their six Emeralds. Sonic, Tails, Amy, and Knuckles use a Chaos Emerald in their possession to track down the others on the ARK. They infiltrate Eggman's base, boarding his shuttle shortly before it launches into space. Knuckles' Master Emerald shards are spilled along the way, and he leaves to collect them. He fights Rouge again, but when he saves her from falling into a lava pit, she relinquishes her shards and he restores the Master Emerald.

On the ARK, Tails reveals he has made a counterfeit Chaos Emerald to destroy the Eclipse Cannon. As Sonic is about to use it, Eggman tells him that he has captured Tails and Amy, forcing him to return and rescue them. Sonic tries to trick Eggman with the fake Emerald, but Eggman sees through the plan and jettisons him in an escape pod rigged with explosives. Tails, thinking Sonic is dead, fights and defeats Eggman. Sonic uses the power of the fake Emerald to initiate "Chaos Control" and escape; Shadow is sent to intercept him.

Regardless of who wins the fight, Eggman sneaks away from Tails and Amy with the last Emerald and arms the Eclipse Cannon. The entire colony suddenly starts falling, and a prerecorded message from Gerald is broadcast globally: he programmed the ARK to collide with Earth if the Emeralds were used, destroying it in revenge for the government condemning his research and killing his colleagues, including Maria. Everyone but Shadow works together to access the cannon's core and neutralize the ARK using the Master Emerald.

Amy pleads for Shadow's help, allowing him to remember what Maria really requested of Shadow: for him to help mankind. Shadow catches up with Sonic and Knuckles in the core as they encounter the Biolizard, a prototype Ultimate Life Form. Shadow repels it, allowing Knuckles to deactivate the Chaos Emeralds with the Master Emerald. The Biolizard uses Chaos Control to fuse with the cannon, becoming the Finalhazard and continuing the ARK's collision course.

Sonic and Shadow use the Emeralds to transform into their super forms, defeating the Finalhazard and using Chaos Control to teleport the ARK back into stable orbit. This depletes Shadow's energy and he plummets to Earth, content in fulfilling his promise to Maria. The people on Earth celebrate as the heroes return home, and Sonic bids Shadow farewell.

Development 

Sonic Adventure 2 was developed by Sonic Team USA, a former American division of Sonic Team, and published by Sega. It was directed and produced by longtime series contributors Takashi Iizuka and Yuji Naka respectively. Development began shortly after the release of the American version of Sonic Adventure in September 1999, and lasted 18 months. It was designed to be more action-oriented than the slower, more story-based Adventure. The development team ran the game at 60 frames per second with "tempo", giving Sonic a variety of actions rather than focusing on speed alone. Its levels facilitated this flow, making Sonic seem faster. All six playable characters have roughly equal gameplay time (unlike Adventure, in which some characters had short stories).

The levels and environments were inspired by San Francisco, where Sonic Team had its office, and other American locations, such as Yosemite National Park (where the team vacationed) and the San Francisco Bay Area. Compared to Adventure, the sequel was intended to have "more of an American flavor". Although the level design prioritized the frame rate, it was more streamlined than Adventure because of the team's experience with Dreamcast hardware. Whereas Sonic Team had tried to include as much content as possible in Sonic Adventure, for the sequel they only concentrated on the elements they deemed necessary. Naka said Sonic Adventure 2 was also easier to develop, as Sonic Team could now "tap the full power of the console and deliver a much better experience".

Iizuka described the Chao as a "relative neutral entity" in Sonic Adventure. In the sequel, the developers expanded their presence, adding the ability to raise "Hero" and "Dark" Chao to reflect the conflict between good and evil. Chao have the ability to socialize, so they resemble a "real artificial life form".

Sonic Team showcased Sonic Adventure 2 with a trailer at E3 2000, and uploaded the trailer to its website on June 30. Sonic Team posted a trailer and a number of screenshots on May 30, 2001, with Sega promoting Sonic Adventure 2 as the last Sonic game for the Dreamcast and as marking the series' 10th anniversary. Sega held a 10th-anniversary party for Sonic in June 2001, at which attendees could compete in a battle tournament; the winner played against Iizuka.

Music 
As with Sonic Adventure, Jun Senoue served as sound director and lead composer. Additional music was contributed by Fumie Kumatani, Tomoya Ohtani, and Kenichi Tokoi. The soundtrack is primarily melodic rock, with some hip hop and orchestral tracks. As in Adventure, each character has a musical theme. The game features performances by returning vocalists Tony Harnell, Ted Poley, Marlon Saunders, Nikki Gregoroff and Johnny Gioeli, and new vocalists Tabitha Fair, Todd Cooper, Paul Shortino, Everett Bradley, Kaz Silver and Hunnid-P. Crush 40 (consisting of Senoue and Gioeli) debuted on the game's main theme, "Live and Learn". Production of the music lasted from April 2000 to February 2001; after this Senoue, along with others, created sound effects.

The team wanted Sonic Adventure 2 audio to stand out, rather than merely serving as background music. Senoue felt that some of Sonic Adventure tracks were not as memorable as others. He and the Wave Master musicians made a pact with them "to write songs that promoted the game's speed and situations while keeping the best tempo of the stage". Senoue wrote each track before producing a demo version, and mixed them with a Yamaha digital console and Mackie analog mixer. He edited tracks using a Mac. After Sonic Team approved the music, Senoue finished sequencing it and sent it to the musicians for production.

Several soundtrack albums for the game were released. Sonic Adventure 2 Multi-Dimensional Original Soundtrack was released in Japan by Marvelous Entertainment on September 5, 2001. Sonic Adventure 2 Vocals Collection: Cuts Unleashed, an album with character theme tracks by Senoue and Tokoi, was released by MMV in Japan on August 21, 2001. For the 20th anniversary of the Sonic series, Sonic Adventure 2 Original Soundtrack 20th Anniversary Edition was released on iTunes on June 22, 2011. On October 29, 2014, a two-volume original soundtrack was released on iTunes. The soundtrack was also released as a vinyl LP by Brave Wave Productions in January 2018, and includes interviews with Senoue and Iizuka.

Re-releases

Sonic Adventure 2: Battle 
In January 2001, Sega departed the console business to be a software publisher. Sonic Adventure 2 was ported to the Nintendo GameCube as Sonic Adventure 2: Battle on December 20, 2001. Battle has more detailed textures and additional geometry, and adds multiplayer options including new abilities, upgrades, and exclusive characters. Big the Cat is replaced by a Dark Chao in multiplayer mode. Battle also upgrades much of the Chao system, with a Chao's stats viewable within the game, and the option to transfer Chao from Sonic Adventure 2 Battle to the Tiny Chao Garden in Sonic Advance, Sonic Advance 2, and Sonic Pinball Party with the GameCube – Game Boy Advance link cable. If a Game Boy Advance is connected without a game, a version of the Tiny Chao Garden can be copied temporarily into the Game Boy Advance memory. This version also introduces the Chao Karate feature.

In Europe, Battle was marketed and distributed by Infogrames, following a deal to distribute Sega's games on the GameCube and GBA.

Downloadable versions 
Sonic Adventure 2 was re-released in high definition on the PlayStation Network in North America on October 2, 2012, in Europe on October 3, 2012 and in Japan on October 4, 2012. It was released worldwide on the Xbox Live Arcade on October 5, 2012 and on Windows via Steam on November 19, 2012. The additional Battle content is available as downloadable content. On November 30, 2017, the Xbox 360 version was made backward compatible with the Xbox One, and was later extended to the Xbox Series X/S.

Reception 

Sonic Adventure 2 received "generally favorable" reviews. Critics appreciated the game's multiple playing styles. According to Edge and reviewer Four-Eyed Dragon of GamePro, the core game's three styles and bonus features such as Chao gardens made the game engaging. Johnny Liu of GameRevolution praised its replay value of multiple playing styles and 180 different goals. Anthony Chau of IGN called it one of the best Sonic games: "If this is the last Sonic game in these declining Dreamcast years, it's satisfying to know that the DC didn't go out with a bang, but with a sonic boom."  In 2022, IGN would rank the title as one of the best Dreamcast games.

The camera was largely panned. Shahed Ahmed of GameSpot criticized the "cardinal sin" of 3D platform games: forcing players to jump to an out-of-frame platform. Although players can re-orient the camera with the trigger buttons, it reverts when the character moves. According to Chau and Liu, this made searching cramped sections of Knuckles' and Rouge's levels frustrating. Edge found camera problems permeating the game, with no significant improvement from Adventure.

The visuals received positive reviews. Liu called the graphics "sweet, sweet eye-crack." Four-Eyed Dragon wrote that the game "is simply jaw-dropping beautiful," citing its detailed backgrounds and scenery and the characters' extensive color palettes. According to Chau, the game had "some of the best textures ever seen" and was one of the most beautiful Dreamcast games. Edge was impressed by the texture detail and draw distance, and Chau, Liu and Ahmed praised its 60-frame-per-second rendering speed.

Senoue's soundtrack garnered a positive reaction. According to Ahmed, the music was an improvement over Adventure "campy glam-rock and J-pop soundtrack," with less emphasis on lyrics, and Liu appreciated its more "understated" approach. Four-Eyed Dragon called the music "an eclectic mix of orchestrated masterpieces, guitar tunes, and melodic hip-hop voices" that "gracefully fill the game's ambiance to a perfect pitch." Reactions to the voice acting were divided; according to Ahmed, "the voice acting, and the lip-synching in particular, is executed quite well," and Liu and Chau thought the English voices were inferior to the Japanese ones.

The plot was derided, although its presentation was well received. Ahmed wrote, "Throughout the game the plot becomes more and more scattered and lackluster," not focusing long enough on one element to execute it meaningfully. Although Liu agreed that despite the game's ambitious scope and themes it failed to advance the series' core plot beyond the Sega Genesis Sonic games, Edge appreciated the story's presentation from both perspectives: hero and villain.

Despite high review scores for the Dreamcast version, the GameCube version released six months later received mixed reviews: respective Metacritic and GameRankings scores of 73 percent and 72.33 percent. Critics generally felt that it was not significantly improved from the Dreamcast original. However, Shane Bettenhausen of GameSpy saw Battle as noticeably superior; in addition to its upgrades, its action was better suited to the GameCube's controller than the Dreamcast's.

Sales 
The Dreamcast version of Sonic Adventure 2 sold around 918,000 copies in the US, and 108,480 copies in Japan.

Sonic Adventure 2 Battle for the GameCube sold almost 50,000 copies during its first week in Japan, where it went on to sell 192,186 units as of December 23, 2002. In North America, it was the best-selling GameCube title between January and August 2002, with 465,000 copies sold during that period. By August 2002, Battle had sold more than  copies worldwide. By July 2006, it had sold 1.2 million copies and earned $44 million in the United States. Next Generation ranked it as the 42nd highest-selling game launched for the PlayStation 2, Xbox or GameCube between January 2000 and July 2006 in that country. It sold 1.44 million copies in the United States , making it one of the best-selling GameCube games and the best-selling third-party game for the system.

Sonic Adventure 2 Battle also sold more than 100,000 units in the United Kingdom, for a total of over  units sold worldwide for the GameCube. This adds up to a combined total of more than 2,758,666 units sold worldwide for both the Dreamcast and GameCube versions.

Accolades 
Sonic Adventure 2 received several accolades, including the 2001 IGN's Editors' Choice Award. ScrewAttack called it the fifth-best Dreamcast game, and GamesRadar rated it the tenth-greatest Dreamcast game out of 25: "Despite trailing off significantly in recent years, the 3D side of the Sonic the Hedgehog franchise had a surprisingly stellar start with the Sonic Adventure entries, and the 2001 sequel really amped up the action." In February 2014, IGN'''s Luke Karmali called Battle his tenth-favorite game of all time. In a video interview with Takashi Iizuka, he says Sonic Adventure 2 is his favourite Sonic game.

 Legacy 
Shadow and Rouge, who debuted in Adventure 2, have become recurring characters in the Sonic franchise. Both appeared along with new character E-123 Omega as "Team Dark," one of the playable character teams, in Sonic Heroes (2003), the follow-up to Adventure 2. A Shadow spin-off, Shadow the Hedgehog (2005), expanded on the Adventure 2 plot and featured a similar 3D platforming gameplay.

With a few modifications, the plots of Adventure and Adventure 2 were adapted into the second season of the anime Sonic X (2003–06). American licensing corporation 4Kids Entertainment hired an entirely new voice cast for the English dub, but the Japanese cast from the games reprised their roles in the original version of the show.Sonic Generations (2011), released to mark the series' twentieth anniversary, contains gameplay elements and levels from various Sonic games. Elements from Sonic Adventure 2 included a remake of the City Escape stage in the console versions and a remake of the Radical Highway stage in the Nintendo 3DS version. Shadow also appears in a re-creation of his boss battle, and the Biolizard boss is re-created in the 3DS version.

 Notes 

 References 

 External links 

 Sonic Adventure 2 at Sega's Dreamcast Minisite 
 Sonic Adventure 2'' at Sega.com
 Sonic Adventure 2 Battle at SonicTeam.com

2001 video games
3D platform games
Action-adventure games
Dreamcast games
Video games about impact events
Multiplayer and single-player video games
PlayStation 3 games
PlayStation Network games
Sega Studio USA games
Sonic Team games
Sonic the Hedgehog video games
Terrorism in fiction
Video game sequels
Video games about genetic engineering
Video games developed in the United States
Video games produced by Yuji Naka
Video games set in outer space
Video games set on fictional islands
Video games scored by Jun Senoue
Video games scored by Fumie Kumatani
Video games scored by Tomoya Ohtani
Video games with alternative versions
Windows games
Xbox 360 Live Arcade games
Video games scored by Kenichi Tokoi